Georgi Vasilyevich Bazayev (born 26 August 1978) is a former Russian professional footballer.

Club career
He made his debut in the Russian Premier League in 2001 for FC Alania Vladikavkaz.

Personal life
He is the brother of Jambulad Bazayev.

References

1978 births
People from Rustavi
Living people
Russian footballers
Association football midfielders
FC Kuban Krasnodar players
FC Luch Vladivostok players
FC Spartak Vladikavkaz players
Russian Premier League players
FC Spartak-UGP Anapa players